Songs from Black Mountain is the eighth studio album by Live. It was released in most countries on April 10, 2006, but was released on May 9 in Canada, May 29 in the UK and June 6 in the US. It was their only release through Epic Records. The first single, "The River", was released on March 21, 2006. It is the last album to feature lead vocalist Ed Kowalczyk before his departure from the band in 2009. It is also the final studio album to feature the original lineup (Kowalczyk, Chad Taylor, Patrick Dahlheimer, Chad Gracey). Kowalcyzk rejoined in 2016, but Taylor, Dahlheimer, and Gracey were all fired from the band by the end of 2022.

Although the album had some international success, including reaching number 1 in the Netherlands, it had the lowest US sales of any of Live's studio albums since their first album, Mental Jewelry, peaking at number 52 on the Billboard 200.

Background
Live signed with Epic Records in 2005, having left Radioactive after the release of their 2003 album, Birds of Pray. Singer Ed Kowalczyk explained that Songs from Black Mountain is in the same vein as Birds of Pray: "The album itself kind of took its lead from where we were with Birds of Pray, which was just a really basic, stripped [approach]...It's just amazing. It's just a great album and the excitement level of [Epic] and the band, everybody is just really pretty blown away by it."

Track listing

Personnel
Live
Ed Kowalczyk – lead vocals, rhythm guitar
Chad Taylor – lead guitar 
Patrick Dahlheimer – bass
Chad Gracey – drums

Charts

Weekly charts

Year-end charts

Singles

Certifications

References

External links
 

2006 albums
Epic Records albums
Live (band) albums